Dave Mustaine (born 16 November 1992) is an Indonesian professional footballer who plays as a midfielder for Liga 1 club PSS Sleman.

Career statistics

Club

Honours

Club
PSS Sleman
 Liga 2: 2018

References

External links 
 
 Dave Mustaine at Liga Indonesia

1992 births
Living people
Indonesian footballers
Liga 2 (Indonesia) players
Liga 1 (Indonesia) players
PSS Sleman players
Persegres Gresik players
Gresik United players
Arema F.C. players
Association football midfielders
People from Sidoarjo Regency
Sportspeople from East Java